Mondego may refer to:

 Mondego River, Portugal
 Rio Mondego, another name for the Miranda River (Brazil) 
 Baixo Mondego, a subregion of Portugal
 Cabo Mondego, natural monument in Portugal
 Metro Mondego, light rail network in Coimbra, Portugal
 Fernand Mondego, a villain in the novel The Count of Monte Cristo by Alexandre Dumas

See also 
 Baixo Mondego Subregion, Portugal
 Montego (disambiguation)